Ghostbox or Ghost box may refer to:
 Ghost Box Records, a recording label
 Ghostbox (paranormal research device), a radio with a frequency scan mode meant to detect EVPs and communicate with spirits